Darband-e Kamalvand (also Romanized as Darband-e Kamālvand; also known as Darband and Darband-e Faqīrān) is a village in Dehpir Rural District, in the Central District of Khorramabad County, Lorestan Province, Iran. At the 2006 census, its population was 361, in 76 families.

References 

Towns and villages in Khorramabad County